Drug Development and Industrial Pharmacy is an academic journal that publishes research on aspects of drug development and production, as well as the evaluation of drugs and pharmaceutical products.

Core areas 

Topics covered include:

 Emerging technologies in pharmaceutical development and industrial pharmacy
 In vitro–In vivo correlations
 Oral controlled release systems
 Drug delivery
 Preclinical drug development, pharmacokinetics and pharmacodynamics
 Drug pharmacokinetics and pharmacodynamics
 Biopharmaceutics and oral absorption
 Aerosols
 Transdermals
 Preformulation and physical pharmacy
 Methodologies, including statistical design/optimisation, if there is clear clinical relevance.

The journal is owned by Informa plc,  a United Kingdom–based publisher and conference company.

Editor 

Hugh D. Smyth is the journal's editor-in-chief. He holds the Delgado Endowed Professorship at the College of Pharmacy, University of Texas at Austin.

Publication format 

The journal publishes 12 issues per year in simultaneous print and online editions and is available on a subscription basis. Individual articles can be purchased on a pay-per-view basis.  All back-issues of the journal are available online and are hosted on the publisher's website.

Subscribers to the electronic edition of the journal receive access to the online archive, which dates back to 1974.

References

External links
Journal homepage

Publications established in 1974
Pharmaceutical sciences
Pharmacology journals
English-language journals
Monthly journals